Shaheed Agha Ziauddin Rizviشہید آغا ضیاء الدین رضوی was a Shi'a cleric born at Amphary, Gilgit, in a religious family. He completed his early schooling in Gilgit; he later moved to Lahore, and afterwards Iran, for higher religious education. He also visited UK and Kuwait as a member of a tablighee delegation in the early 1980s.

He rose to prominence in 1990 after playing an important role in restoring peace and reconciliation after the sectarian attack by terrorists, which left over 300 people dead. He served as Imam of Friday prayers at Markazi Jamia Imamia Masjid Gilgit and head of shia community of GILGIT-BALTISTAN for 15 years until his death.

He was attacked by terrorists on January 8, 2005 in an attack in which two of his body guards were killed. He was transferred to Combined Military Hospital Rawalpindi via helicopter. He died at CMH Rawalpindi on January 13, 2005 at 10:00 PST.

References

People from Gilgit
1958 births
2005 deaths
Terrorism deaths in Pakistan
Pakistani terrorism victims
Pakistani Shia clerics